Johann Peter Pichler (May 13, 1765 – March 18, 1807) was an Austrian engraver known for his mezzotints after old masters.

Pichler was born in Bozen (Bolzano) and was a pupil of Jacob Matthias Schmutzer (1733–1811) and Johann Jacobé (1733–1797), whose daughter he married. He is known for works after paintings for the noble courts of Vienna and Dresden. He is sometimes mentioned as a relative of Anton Pichler, who was also born near Bozen, but no known relationship has been established.

Gallery

References

External links
 Johann Peter Pichler in RKDartists

1765 births
1807 deaths
People from Bolzano
Austrian engravers
Artists from Vienna